The Wind River is the name applied to the upper reaches of the Bighorn River in Wyoming in the United States. The two rivers are sometimes referred to as the Wind/Bighorn.

Course

Its headwaters are at Wind River Lake in the Rocky Mountains, near the summit of Togwotee Pass (pronounced TOH-guh-tee) and gathers water from several forks along the northeast side of the Wind River Range in west central Wyoming. It flows southeastward, across the Wind River Basin and the Wind River Indian Reservation and joins the Little Wind River near Riverton. Up stream from this confluence, it is known locally as the Big Wind River. It flows northward, through a gap in the Owl Creek Mountains, where the name of the river becomes the Bighorn River. In the Owl Creek Mountains, it is dammed to form Boysen Reservoir. The Wind River officially becomes the Bighorn River at the Wedding of the Waters, on the north side of the Wind River Canyon.

See also
List of rivers of Wyoming
List of tributaries of the Missouri River

References

External links
Wyoming State Water Plan: Wind/Bighorn Rivers
U.S. Fish and Wildlife Service: Wind/Bighorn River Drainage
Wind River History
Wind River Info

Rivers of Wyoming
Tributaries of the Yellowstone River
Rivers of Teton County, Wyoming
Bodies of water of Hot Springs County, Wyoming